This is a list of concept vehicles produced by Dodge, a division of Stellantis.

Concept Vehicles

 Dodge Avenger Concept (2003)
 Dodge Aviat (1994)
 Dodge Caravan R/T (1999)
 Dodge Challenger Concept (2006)
 Dodge Charger Concept (1964)
 Dodge Challenger Mopar Drag Pak Concept (2014)
 Dodge Challenger SRT10 Concept (2008)
 Dodge Challenger Targa Concept (2008)
 Dodge Charger II (1965)
 Dodge Charger III (1968)
 Dodge Charger IV (1968)
 Dodge Charger R/T (1999)
 Dodge Charger Daytona SRT Concept (2022)
 Dodge Copperhead (1997)
 Dodge Custom Swinger 340 (1969)
 Dodge Dakota Sport V8 (1990)
 Dodge Daroo I (1968)
 Dodge Daroo II (1969)
 Dodge Daytona R/T (1990)
 Dodge Demon (2007)
 Dodge Deora (1967)
 Dodge Diamante (1971)
 Dodge EPIC (1992)
 Dodge EV (2008)
 Dodge Firearrow Series (1954)
 Dodge Flitewing (1961)
 Dodge Granada (1954)
 Dodge Hornet (2006)
 Dodge Intrepid (1988)
 Dodge Intrepid ESX series (1996, 1998, 2003)
 Dodge Kahuna (2003)
 Dodge LRT (1990)
 Dodge M4S (1984), featured in the film The Wraith
 Dodge M80 (2002)
 Dodge MAXXcab (2000)
 Dodge Mirada Magnum (1980)
 Dodge Neon Concept (1991)
 Dodge Powerbox (2001)
 Dodge Power Wagon Concept (1999)
 Dodge Rampage Concept (2006)
 Dodge Razor (2002)
 Dodge Scat Packer (1968)
 Dodge Shelby Street Fighter (1983)
 Dodge Shakedown Challenger Concept (2016)
 Dodge Sidewinder (1998)
 Dodge Sling Shot (2004)
 Dodge Street Van (1978)
 Dodge Super Bee Convertible (1968)
 Dodge Super Charger (1970)
 Dodge Super Charger 1968 Concept (2018)
 Dodge Super 8 Hemi (2001)
 Dodge Tomahawk (2003, concept motorcycle)
 Dodge T-Rex (1997)
 Dodge Turbo Dart (1962)
 Dodge Turbo Power Giant (1962)
 Dodge Venom (1994)
 Dodge Viper VM-01 (1989)
 Dodge Viper GTS (1993)
 Dodge Zeder (1953)
 Dodge ZEO (2008)

References

Further reading
 Frumkin, Mitchel J. and Hall, Phil. American Dream Cars: 60 Years of the Best Concept Vehicles. 2002.